Shotton is a town and community in Flintshire, Wales, within the Deeside conurbation along the River Dee, joined with Connah's Quay, near the border with England. It is located 5 miles (8 km) west of Chester and can be reached by road from the A548. In the 2011 census Shotton had a population of 6,663. 
The Ordnance Survey Grid Reference is SJ305685.

Etymologies
The town's name is first recorded in Old English as Cyllingas. This name derives from the Welsh language word Celyn (meaning Holly) and has persisted in one form or another throughout the town's history. By 1822 Richard Willett recorded the name as Kyllins, which he says contains "one of the parish's most notable ancient houses". Even today, Killin's Farm and Killin's Lane may still be found in the oldest part of town.

The town's modern English name is shared with three other towns in Britain. These towns (all on the English side of the Scottish border) derive their names from Town of Scots but it is unlikely that a Flintshire town shares this etymology. The name probably derives from Scēot-tūn = "farmstead on or near a steep slope", or from Shot-tūn = "farmstead in a clearing in the wood". The town is officially named Shotton in both English and Welsh, making it one of the few towns in Wales to officially have neither a recognised Welsh spelling or Welsh etymology.

History
Founded by Anglo-Saxons, the town grew from the 18th century around coal mining and farming on reclaimed marshland. Shotton also became a railway junction. The John Summers & Sons steelworks was established in 1896 on a six acre site. At its peak it employed over 13,000. Following nationalisation in 1967, the works became part of the British Steel Corporation. 
Although known as Shotton Steelworks, the majority of the large plant owned by Tata Steel since 2006, is in neighbouring Connah's Quay.

The town lies under the Hawarden Bridge, which was completed in 1889 as a swing-opening bridge.

Demography
Shotton has an area of 2.34 km², with a density of 3,001 km². The population is roughly 50% male and female and 62.2% are between the ages of 18-64.

The community consists of three electoral wards of the Flintshire County Council local authority:

Education
Shotton is served by the following schools:
 Connah's Quay High School (English-medium secondary)
 Hawarden High School (English-medium secondary)
 St Ethelwold's Primary School (Church in Wales)
 Venerable Edward Morgan School (Roman Catholic primary)
 Ysgol Ty Ffynnon (English-medium primary)
 Ysgol Croes Atti (Welsh-medium primary)
 Ysgol Maes Garmon (Welsh-medium secondary)

John Summers High School (formerly Deeside High School) closed on 20 July 2017.

Transport
Shotton railway station is on the Borderlands Line and the North Wales Coast Line.

Notable people 
 Fred Robson (1885–1952) professional golfer, competed in the Open Championship. 
 Henry Weale VC (1897–1959) recipient of the Victoria Cross in World War I
 Billy Tudor (1918–1965) footballer with 87 club caps, mainly Wrexham A.F.C.
 Marika Humphreys (born 1977) ice dance coach and choreographer, lived in Shotton

See also
St Ethelwold's Church, Shotton

References

External links

History of Shotton
Photos of Shotton and surrounding area on geograph.org.uk

Towns in Flintshire